is the eighth Japanese-language studio album (eleventh overall) by Japanese-American singer Hikaru Utada. It is also her first bilingual album release, with songs in both Japanese and English. It was released on the Sony Music Japan sublabel Epic Records Japan digitally on January 19, 2022, the day of Utada's 39th birthday, and was released physically on CD and limited CD-DVD-BD format bundle on February 23. It marked her first album release in four years.

Six previously released songs were confirmed for the album, including title track "Bad Mode", the Shiseido commercial theme song "Find Love", and the Kingdom Hearts III theme song "Face My Fears". The album includes collaborations with a variety of producers, including Skrillex and Poo Bear, A. G. Cook, and Sam Shepherd. Describing the record's themes, MTV wrote that Bad Mode is largely about growing up, self-love, self-partnering, and acceptance". It utilizes various musical styles including pop, jazz, electronica and R&B.

Bad Mode received critical acclaim from music critics, with The Japan Times calling it a career highlight. It was named one of the best albums of the year by various music publications including Pitchfork and Slant Magazine;  "Somewhere Near Marseilles" was also ranked within the top 10 on both publication's lists of Best Songs of 2022. Commercially, the album received a gold certification from the Recording Industry Association of Japan (RIAJ) within a month of its release with over 100,000 copies sold.

Background and packaging 
The CD + DVD + Blu-ray release comes with the regular audio CD, five music videos ("Time", "One Last Kiss", "Pink Blood", "Kimi ni Muchū" and "Bad Mode") and the full recorded concert "Hikaru Utada Live Sessions from Air Studios". The concert was recorded at London's Air Studios, with bassist Jodi Milliner as the bandmaster. Sound engineer Steve Fitzmaurice worked in sound recording and mixing, and David Barnard in the video direction. Hikaru Utada's son, who is six years old at the moment of the album's release, participated in the album, having violin credits in "Bad Mode" and vocal credits in "Not in the Mood" under the name The Artist's Son. He also appears on the album cover.

Composition 
In contrast to her past albums, Bad Mode revolves around Utada's relationship with herself. She states that most of the songs were written during the COVID-19 pandemic and containing reflections on being a mother, surviving through difficult times, and working to improve her own state of being and relationships with other people.

Promotion 
Despite having no tour to promote the album, Utada performed for the first time in the famous Coachella Valley Music and Arts Festival in April 17, 2022, being a part of the 88rising label block, singing some old hits and "Face My Fears" from Bad Mode, and a new song called "T", released after the concert ended for streaming, in the 88rising's EP Head in the Clouds Forever. Due to fans request, the concert Hikaru Utada Live Sessions from Air Studios was released in June 9, 2022, for streaming in Netflix and as Utada's first ever digital live album.

In September 2022, Utada performed "Somewhere Near Marseilles" live at the Yokohama Hakkeijima Sea Paradise zoo. An accompanying video of the performance was released exclusively to Spotify in part of their five year anniversary celebration of the service launching in Japan.

Accolades

Track listing

Notes 
 "Bad Mode" and "Pink Blood" are stylized in all upper case lettering.

Personnel 
Musicians

 Hikaru Utada – production (1–13), writing (all tracks), vocals (all tracks), keyboards, programming (1–5, 7, 8, 10, 12); piano (1), additional drum programming (9, 13), additional keyboards and programming (11), shaker (10), Korean WaveDrum (10), vocals recording (1–3, 6–8, 10, 12)
 Nariaki Obukuro – production, keyboards (5, 7, 8, 11, 12); programming (5, 7, 8, 11, 12), vocals recording (11)
 Sam Shepherd – production, keyboards, programming (1, 6, 10); Rhodes piano (1), piano (6)
 A. G. Cook – production (2, 3, 14), keyboards (3), programming (2, 3), remix (14)
 Skrillex – production, programming (9, 13); writing (9, 13, 14), mixing (9, 13)
 Poo Bear – production (9, 13), writing (9, 13, 14)
 Jodi Milliner – writing (1), bass (1, 4, 6, 11, 13), synth bass (2, 3, 9), Moog bass & Juno pad (5)
 Ben Parker – guitar (1, 6, 7), acoustic guitar (11)
 Reuben James – Wurlitzer piano (4), acoustic piano (9, 13), piano (11)
 Will Fry – percussion (1, 7, 10)
 Leo Taylor – drums (1)
 Ash Soan – percussion (6)
 Freddie Gavita – trumpet (1)
 Soweto Kinch – saxophone
 Chris Dave – percussion (9, 13)
 Yuta Bandoh – string arrangement, conducting (11)
 Ensemble FOVE – strings (11)
 Darren Heelis – additional drum programming (5)
 Tom Norris – additional drum programming (9, 13), mixing (9, 13)
 Nobuaki Tanaka – additional programming (11)
 The Artist's Son – violin (1), vocals (6)

Technical
 Steve Fitzmaurice – recording (1, 3, 4, 6, 7, 11), mixing (1–8, 10–12), additional instrumental recording (9)
 Masahito Komori – vocals recording (4, 5, 9), strings recording (11), vocal tracks editing (4)
 Yuya Saito – vocal tracks editing (1–8, 10–12)
 Darren Heelis – additional recording (5), vocal recording assistance, additional engineering (7)
 Marek Deml – recording, additional vocals recording (4)
 Matt Jones – additional engineering assistance (7)
 Randy Merrill – mastering

Charts

Weekly charts

Monthly charts

Year-end charts

Sales and certifications

Release history

References

External links
Bad Mode on Hikaru Utada's official website

2022 albums
Albums recorded at RAK Studios
Epic Records albums
Japanese-language albums
Sony Music Entertainment Japan albums
Milan Records albums
Hikaru Utada albums
Albums produced by A. G. Cook
Albums produced by Skrillex
Albums produced by Poo Bear